Self Harvest is the first studio album from Ark of the Covenant. Facedown Records released the album on April 30, 2013. Ark of the Covenant worked with Greg Thomas, in the production of this album.

Critical reception

Awarding the album four stars from HM Magazine, Jef Cunningham states, "Big thumbs up on this one". Oscar Hyde, rating the album six out of ten for Cross Rhythms, writes, "It's just a shame that such powerful diatribes didn't have a more imaginative musical framework." Lee Brown, giving the album four stars at Indie Vision Music, says, "Self Harvest is musically layered and vocally powerful." Tyler Sharp, signaling in a four out of ten review by Mind Equals Blown, describes, "it’s somewhat dumbfounding to see something so generic to come out of their camp."

Track listing

References

2013 debut albums
Facedown Records albums